The Drummer is a bronze sculpture, by Barry Flanagan.

It is at the Hirshhorn Museum and Sculpture Garden. It  was made in 1996, and donated by the artist in 2001.

See also
 List of public art in Washington, D.C., Ward 2

References

1990 sculptures
Hirshhorn Museum and Sculpture Garden
Sculptures of the Smithsonian Institution
Bronze sculptures in Washington, D.C.
Outdoor sculptures in Washington, D.C.
Musical instruments in art